For other localities with the same name, see Tsaratanana (disambiguation)

Tsaratanana Reserve is a nature reserve of Madagascar. The park is located at a high altitude and is closed to the public. The reserve provides a significant amount of water to the area, and many rivers exist in the area, such as the Bemarivo River, Sambirano River and the Ramena or Mahavavy River. The reserve also has two waterfalls and thermal baths.

It includes Maromokotro peak which is the highest mountain of Madagascar at 

The forests in the park are threatened with illegal logging due to obtaining areas for illegal cultivation of marijuana, vanilla and rice.

Geography

The park covers an area of 48,622 ha.

Flora and fauna
Most of the park is in the Madagascar subhumid forests ecoregion. Some high-elevation areas are in the Madagascar ericoid thickets ecoregion.

The reserve is home to animal species that cannot be found anywhere else in the world, including at least four species of endangered frogs: Rhombophryne guentherpetersi, Rhombophryne ornata, Rhombophryne tany, and Cophyla alticola.

References

Protected areas of Madagascar
Diana Region
Madagascar subhumid forests
Important Bird Areas of Madagascar